Jackson Hugh Lind (born June 8, 1946, in Denver, Colorado) is a retired Major League Baseball shortstop, first baseman, second baseman, and third baseman. He played during two seasons at the major league level for the Milwaukee Brewers, as well as one season in Japan for the Yomiuri Giants. He was drafted by the Houston Astros in the 7th round of the secondary phase of the 1967 Major League Baseball Draft.

After retiring from playing, Lind began a managing career in the minor leagues.

German baseball club Buchbinder Legionäre Regensburg signed Lind as hitting coach and infield coach in 2017.

Jack is a 1964 graduate of Mesa High School in Mesa, Arizona. He is the father of Zach Lind, drummer of the band Jimmy Eat World.

References

External links

1946 births
Living people
Milwaukee Brewers players
Pittsburgh Pirates coaches
Houston Astros scouts
Major League Baseball first basemen
Major League Baseball second basemen
Major League Baseball third basemen
Major League Baseball shortstops
Binghamton Mets managers
Nashville Sounds managers
Vermont Reds players
American expatriate baseball players in Japan
Yomiuri Giants players
Baseball players from Colorado
Baseball coaches from Colorado
Baseball coaches from Arizona
Mesa High School alumni
Arizona Instructional League Mesa players
Albuquerque Dukes players
Asheville Tourists players
Evansville Triplets players
Greensboro Patriots players
Oklahoma City 89ers players
Sacramento Solons players
Trois-Rivières Aigles players
American expatriate baseball players in Canada
Arizona State Sun Devils baseball players
American expatriate baseball people in Germany